Flexible tenancies also known as fixed term flexible tenancies or flexible council tenancies are a type of tenancy in the United Kingdom created by the Localism Act.

References

Tenancies in the United Kingdom